Louis P. Sheldon (June 11, 1934 – May 29, 2020) was an American Presbyterian pastor, and then Anglican priest, and chairman of the social conservative organization, the Traditional Values Coalition. 

He principally spoke and wrote about controversial social issues such as abortion, religious liberty, censorship, and public acceptance of homosexuality and same-sex marriage. He appeared as a guest commentator on the Fox News Channel, on programs such as Cavuto on Business, Hannity & Colmes, and The O'Reilly Factor. He appeared on CNBC, MSNBC, CNN, and PBS, and was featured in newspapers such as The New York Times, The Los Angeles Times, The Wall Street Journal, as well as on numerous national radio talk shows.

Biography
Louis Philip Sheldon was born in 1934 in Washington, D.C., the son of Rex and Gertrude Sheldon. His father was raised in the English Protestant tradition, his mother as an Orthodox Jew. He became a Christian in his teens. He earned a B.S. in history from Michigan State University in 1957. Sheldon and his wife, Beverly, married on August 24, 1957 and had four children.

He received a M.Div. from Princeton Theological Seminary in 1960, the year he was also ordained a Presbyterian minister. He served as a pastor for churches in North Dakota and California before striking out on his own as a lobbyist. 

Sheldon founded the Traditional Values Coalition (TVC) in 1980 as a non-denominational, grassroots movement. In the 1980s and 1990s he wielded influence first in California and then in Washington, DC as a lobbyist for conservative causes, once considered among the ten most influential figures in conservative evangelical politics. TVC has been designated an anti-gay hate group by the Southern Poverty Law Center (SPLC), citing TVC's use of "known falsehoods — claims about LGBT people that have been thoroughly discredited by scientific authorities — and repeated, groundless name-calling."

Sheldon left the Presbyterian ministry after 52 years and was ordained an Anglican priest in March 2012 at St. James Anglican Church (Newport Beach) California, which is part of the Anglican Church in North America. Sheldon was a 2013 delegate representing the Anglican Diocese of The Armed Forces and Chaplaincy to GAFCON II, the Global Anglican Futures Conference, in Nairobi, Kenya. 

He died May 29, 2020 in Orange County, California, aged 85.

Bibliography
Sheldon authored one book:

See also

Christian fundamentalism
Christian right
Hamilton Square Baptist Church protests
Radical right (United States)
C Street Center

References

External links

Michigan State University alumni
1934 births
American Anglican Church in North America priests
Writers from Washington, D.C.
Princeton Theological Seminary alumni
2020 deaths
American people of Jewish descent
Converts to Anglicanism from Presbyterianism
Former Presbyterians
American Continuing Anglicans